The Population Health Forum is a group based at University of Washington in Seattle, Washington, and composed of academics, citizens, students, and activists from around North America.

Purpose and activities 
Activities include development of academic curricula for middle and high schools, advocacy, and maintenance of a population health listserv.

They focus on raising awareness of the population health issue and the social determinants of health. The forum focuses on the role that economic inequality and the gap between rich and poor impact a population’s health, using the “Health Olympics” (a ranking of countries in terms of life expectancy) as a model. The group aims to question why the United States ranks 29th in terms of health while spending half the world’s healthcare bill; it suggests that economic inequality as well as social stressors and loss of social cohesion are prime factors.

Influences 
The ideas of the group are heavily influenced by research into the social determinants of health by social epidemiologists such as Richard G. Wilkinson and Ichiro Kawachi.

See also
 Population health
 Economic inequality
 List of countries by income equality
 Poverty and Cycle of poverty
 Distribution of wealth
 Social determinants of health
 Epidemiology
 Social determinants of health in poverty

External links
 Population Health Forum Website

Resources
 Kawachi, I and BP Kennedy. The Health of Nations: Why Inequality if Harmful to Your Health. New York: The New Press, 2002.
 Wilkinson, R. Unhealthy Societies: The Affliction of Inequality. London: Routledge, 1996.
 Wilkinson, R. The Impact of Inequality: How to Make Sick Societies Healthier. New York: The New Press, 2005.

Public health organizations
Health education in the United States
Organizations based in Washington (state)